Live in Rio is the third DVD by Canadian jazz pianist and vocalist Diana Krall, released in 2009 (see 2009 in music). It is also available in HD on Blu-ray mastered in DTS-HD 5.1 audio.  It comes in two versions: the standard edition with performances from Rio and the special edition, which adds a second disk of other performances.

Track listing

Standard Edition
"I Love Being Here With You"
"Let's Fall in Love"
"Where or When"
"Too Marvelous for Words"
"I've Grown Accustomed to His Face"
"Walk on By"
"Frim Fram Sauce"
"Cheek to Cheek"
"You're My Thrill"
"Let's Face the Music and Dance"
"Every Time We Say Goodbye"
"So Nice"
"Quiet Nights"
"Este Seu Olhar"
"The Boy From Ipanema"
"I Don't Know Enough About You"
"S'Wonderful"
"Exactly Like You"

Conversations

Promotion Film
 The Boy From Ipanema

Special Edition
Disc 1
(Same As Standard Edition Disc)

Disc 2
The Toronto Becel Benefit Performance
 Where Or When
 Exactly Like You
 Walk on By
 Deed I Do
 Quiet Nights
 Frim Fram Sauce
 A Case of You
 I Don't Know Enough About You
The Madrid Session
 Deed I Do
 So Nice
 PS I Love You
The Lisbon Session
 Walk on By
 Este Seu Olhar
The Rio Rooftop Session
 The Boy From Ipanema
 Too Marvellous for Words
 Cheek to Cheek
Promotion Film
 Quiet Nights

Charts

Certifications

References

External links

 - Review including personnel

Diana Krall live albums
2009 live albums
Verve Records live albums